The A1011 is a road in East London, England which links Stratford with Canning Town, and Silvertown.

Route

Canning Town interchange 

The Canning Town interchange is a major interchange where the road meets the A13 and the A124 road. The interchange also consists of the Canning Town bus station and Canning Town station, which is on the Jubilee line to Stratford, Central London and Stanmore. The DLR also stops here as 3 branches meet with services to Bank station, Tower Gateway DLR station, Poplar, Beckton, Custom House, London City Airport, Woolwich Arsenal station, Stratford station and Stratford International station.

Future

Silvertown Tunnel

The proposed Silvertown Tunnel is expected to end on the A1011 Silvertown Way. The scheme is expected to be completed in 2025. There will be tolls to use the tunnel, as well as the Blackwall Tunnel, making the Rotherhithe Tunnel and Tower Bridge busier.

Royal Docks corridor

There are also plans for Silvertown Way and North Woolwich Road. According to Newham Council, these plans include:

Make it easier, safer and more convenient for people to walk, cycle and use public transport
Improve air quality and reduce pollution levels
Reduce the dominance of traffic
Slow down vehicle speeds
Provide a much safer environment for pedestrians and cyclists
Improve access and connections to the DLR stations along the route
Ensure that bus services run smoothly and are on time
Include more greenery, trees and planting
Make people feel safer and more comfortable in the area
Make the street more attractive and create a 'sense of place' so that people enjoy spending time here

This scheme is due to be completed in summer 2024.

References

Transport in the London Borough of Newham
Roads in England
Roads in London